Lavington School is a secondary school in Market Lavington, Wiltshire, England, which became an academy in January 2011. From September 2018 the school gained a sixth form, in partnership with Devizes School.

History
The school opened in 1962 as a secondary modern and became a comprehensive in 1973. There used to be a link between the school and Dauntsey's School, where pupils could go to study in the sixth form at Dauntsey's. However, this link ended around 1994. In the 1970s and 80s, the school had four houses: Bradon (blue), Grovely (green), Ridgeway (red) and Wansdyke (yellow).

Under the defunct specialist schools programme, the school held Maths and Computing College status.

Buildings
The school complex includes a sports hall, main hall, main building, drama block, humanities block and science block. There are also numerous non-educational buildings around the site, including an old farm previously acquired by the school.

Headteachers
A list of the school's headteachers is as follows:

References

External links

Market Lavington Museum blog

Academies in Wiltshire
Secondary schools in Wiltshire
Educational institutions established in 1962